This article is a list of episodes for the ONA series, . The majority of episode titles are parodies of miscellaneous anime, manga and other media.

See also
Penguin Musume

References

Penguin Musume Heart